Falla may refer to:

Places
Falla (Chambas), a village in Ciego de Ávila Province, Cuba
Falla, Östergötland, a village in Östergötland County, Sweden
Mount Falla, a mountain in Antarctica

Other uses
Falles (or Fallas), Valencian traditional celebration
 Falla monument, the artifact burnt during this celebration

People with the name
Alejandro Falla (born 1983), Colombian tennis player
Emilio Falla (born 1986), Ecuadorian racing cyclist
Luis Falla, Peruvian politician
Maiken Caspersen Falla (born 1990), Norwegian cross-country skier
Manuel de Falla (1876–1946), Spanish composer
Norris Stephen Falla (1883–1945), New Zealand manager, military leader and aviation promoter
Robert Falla (1901–1979), New Zealand scientist
Simon Falla (born 1955), British Royal Air Force officer
Wayne Falla (born 1970), English cricketer
Falla N'Doye (born 1960), Senegalese football referee

See also 
 Fallah, a farmer or agricultural laborer in the Middle East
 Fella (disambiguation)
 Fala (disambiguation)